The Dongqing Dam, also spelled Dongjing, is a concrete face rock-fill dam on the Beipan River bordering Zhenning and Zhenfeng County  northeast of Zhenfeng County's seat in Guizhou Province, China. Construction began in 2005, the river was diverted in 2006, the dam began to impound the reservoir in 2009 and the first generator was commissioned that same year.

See also

List of dams and reservoirs in China
List of major power stations in Guizhou

References

Dams in China
Hydroelectric power stations in Guizhou
Concrete-face rock-fill dams
Dams completed in 2009